The Rezvani Vengeance is a full-size off-road SUV produced by Rezvani Motors since 2022.

History
In October 2022, the American company Rezvani Motors presented a large SUV with nods to the styling of military vehicles and full-fledged off-road cars. The Vengeance was positioned as the largest and most expensive vehicle based on the Cadillac Escalade luxury SUV. Milen Ivanov, a digital artist who had previously designed vehicles for video games, designed the Vengeance to look like a vehicle in a game. The car has 35-inch tires suited to difficult off-road driving. The passenger compartment has the same dashboard as the Cadillac Escalade. The vehicle can transport eight passengers in three rows of seats.

The Vengeance is built to special order, and is priced at the top of the American company's range as a more expensive alternative to the Rezvani Tank. The basic price is US$285,000, increasing to a maximum of $782,250 with all options.

Specifications
Engine options are two 6.2-liter V8 petrol engines generating 420 or 682 hp, and a 3-liter six-cylinder diesel engine with 277 hp, with optional four-wheel drive. A 10-speed automatic transmission from Cadillac is used.

References

Vengeance
All-wheel-drive vehicles
Rear-wheel-drive vehicles
Full-size sport utility vehicles
Cars introduced in 2022